Uvitic acid (5-methylisophthalic acid) is an organic compound with the formula CH3C6H3(COOH)2. The name comes from Latin uva which means a grape. The acid is called so because it may be produced indirectly from tartaric acid, which is found in the grape. Under normal conditions, the acid is a white crystalline substance.

Preparation
Uvitic acid is obtained by oxidizing mesitylene.

See also
Racemic acid
Uvitonic acid

References

Monomers
Dicarboxylic acids
Benzoic acids